The UEFA European Under-18 Championship 1961 Final Tournament was held in Portugal.

Teams
The following teams entered the tournament:

 
 
 
 
 
 
 
 
 
  (host)

Group stage

Group A

Group B

Group C

Group D

Friendlies
Three Friendly Matches were also played during the tournament.

Semifinals

Third place match

Final

External links
Results by RSSSF

UEFA European Under-19 Championship
1960–61 in Austrian football
Under-18
1961
March 1961 sports events in Europe
April 1961 sports events in Europe
Sports competitions in Lisbon
1960s in Lisbon
1961 in youth association football